Walt Disney Pictures is an American film production company and subsidiary of Walt Disney Studios, a division of Disney Entertainment, which is owned by The Walt Disney Company. The studio is the flagship producer of live-action feature films within the Walt Disney Studios unit, and is based at the Walt Disney Studios in Burbank, California. Animated films produced by Walt Disney Animation Studios and Pixar Animation Studios are also released under the studio banner. Walt Disney Studios Motion Pictures distributes and markets the films produced by Walt Disney Pictures.

Disney began producing live-action films in the 1950s. The live-action division became Walt Disney Pictures in 1983, when Disney reorganized its entire studio division; which included the separation from the feature animation division and the subsequent creation of Touchstone Pictures. At the end of that decade, combined with Touchstone's output, Walt Disney Pictures elevated Disney to one of Hollywood's major film studios.

Walt Disney Pictures is currently one of five live-action film studios within the Walt Disney Studios, the others being 20th Century Studios, Marvel Studios, Lucasfilm, and Searchlight Pictures. The 2019 remake of The Lion King is the studio's highest-grossing film worldwide with $1.6 billion, and Pirates of the Caribbean is the studio's most successful film series, with five films earning a total of over $4.5 billion in worldwide box office gross.

History

Predecessor unit 

The studio's predecessor (and the modern-day The Walt Disney Company's as a whole) was founded as the Disney Brothers Cartoon Studio, by filmmaker Walt Disney and his business partner and brother, Roy, in 1923.

The creation of Mickey Mouse and subsequent short films and merchandise generated revenue for the studio which was renamed as The Walt Disney Studio at the Hyperion Studio in 1926. In 1929, it was renamed again to Walt Disney Productions. The studio's streak of success continued in the 1930s, culminating with the 1937 release of the first feature-length animated film, Snow White and the Seven Dwarfs, which becomes a huge financial success. With the profits from Snow White, Walt relocated to a third studio in Burbank, California.

In the 1940s, Disney began experimenting with full-length live-action films, with the introduction of hybrid live action-animated films such as The Reluctant Dragon (1941) and Song of the South (1946). That same decade, the studio began producing nature documentaries with the release of Seal Island (1948), the first of the True-Life Adventures series and a subsequent Academy Award winner for Best Live-Action Short Film.

Walt Disney Productions had its first fully live-action film in 1950 with the release of Treasure Island, considered by Disney to be the official conception for what would eventually evolve into the modern-day Walt Disney Pictures. By 1953, the company ended their agreements with such third-party distributors as RKO Radio Pictures and United Artists and formed their own distribution company, Buena Vista Distribution. By the 1950s, the company had purchased the rights to his work of L. Frank Baum.

1980s–2000s 
The live-action division of Walt Disney Productions was incorporated as Walt Disney Pictures on April 1, 1983, to diversify film subjects and expand audiences for their film releases. In April 1983, Richard Berger was hired by Disney CEO Ron W. Miller as film president. Touchstone Films was started by Miller in February 1984 as a label for the studio's PG-13 and R-rated films with an expected half of Disney's yearly 6-to-8-movie slate, which would be released under the label. That same year, newly named Disney CEO Michael Eisner pushed out Berger, replacing him with Eisner's own film chief from Paramount Pictures, Jeffrey Katzenberg. Touchstone and Hollywood Pictures were formed within that unit on February 15, 1984, and February 1, 1989, respectively.

The Touchstone Films banner was used by then new Disney CEO Michael Eisner in the 1984–1985 television season with the short lived western, Wildside. In the next season, Touchstone produced a hit in The Golden Girls.

David Hoberman was promoted to president of production at Walt Disney Pictures in April 1988. In April 1994, Hoberman was promoted to president of motion picture production at Walt Disney Studios and David Vogel was appointed as Walt Disney Pictures president. The following year, however Hoberman resigned from the company, and instead began a production deal with Disney and his newly formed production company, Mandeville Films. In addition to Walt Disney Pictures, Vogel added the head position of Hollywood Pictures in 1997, while Donald De Line remained as head of Touchstone. Vogel was then promoted in 1998 to the head of Buena Vista Motion Pictures Group, the newly formed division that oversaw all live-action production within the Walt Disney Pictures, Touchstone, and Hollywood labels. The move was orchestrated by Walt Disney Studios chairman Joe Roth, as an effort to scale back and consolidate the studio's film production. As a result of the restructuring, De Line resigned.

That same year, Nina Jacobson became executive vice-president of live-action production for Buena Vista Motion Pictures Group. Jacobson remained under this title until May 1999, when Vogel resigned from the company, and Jacobson was appointed by Roth to the role of president of production. During her tenure, Jacobson oversaw the production of films at Walt Disney Pictures, including Pirates of the Caribbean, The Chronicles of Narnia, Bridge to Terabithia, National Treasure, Remember the Titans, and The Princess Diaries, and was responsible for establishing a first-look deal with Jerry Bruckheimer Films. In 2006, Jacobson was fired by studio chairman Dick Cook, and replaced with by Oren Aviv, the head of marketing.

After two films based on Disney theme park attractions, Walt Disney Pictures selected it as a source of a line of films starting with The Country Bears (2002) and The Haunted Mansion and Pirates of the Caribbean: The Curse of the Black Pearl (both 2003). The latter film—the first film produced by the studio to receive a PG-13 rating—began a film series that was followed by four sequels, with the franchise taking in more than $5.4 billion worldwide from 2003 to 2017. On January 12, 2010, Aviv stepped down as the studio's president of live-action production.

2010s–present 
In January 2010, Sean Bailey was appointed the studio's president of live-action production, replacing Aviv. Bailey had produced Tron: Legacy for the studio, which was released later that same year. Under Bailey's leadership and with support from then Disney CEO Bob Iger—and later studio chairman Alan Horn—Walt Disney Pictures pursued a tentpole film strategy, which included an expanded slate of original and adaptive large-budget tentpole films. Beginning in 2011, the studio simplified the branding in its production logo and marquee credits to just "Disney". Concurrently, Disney was struggling with PG-13 tentpole films outside of the Pirates of the Caribbean series, with films such as John Carter (2012) and The Lone Ranger (2013) becoming major box office bombs. However, the studio had found particular success with live-action fantasy adaptations of properties associated with their animated films, which began with the commercial success of Alice in Wonderland (2010), that became the second billion-dollar-grossing film in the studio's history. With the continued success of Maleficent (2014) and Cinderella (2015), the studio saw the potential in these fantasy adaptations and officiated a trend of similar films, which followed with The Jungle Book (2016) and Beauty and the Beast (2017). By July 2016, Disney had announced development of nearly eighteen of these films consisting of sequels to existing adaptations, origin stories and prequels. Although Walt Disney Pictures produced several successful smaller-budgeted genre films throughout the 2010s, such as The Muppets (2011), Saving Mr. Banks (2013), and Into the Woods (2014), the studio shifted its production model entirely on tentpole films as they had found that a majority of the smaller genre films were becoming financially unsustainable in the theatrical market.

In 2017, The Walt Disney Company announced it was creating its own streaming service platform. The new service, known as Disney+, would feature original programming created by the company's vast array of film and television production studios, including Walt Disney Pictures. As part of this new distribution platform, Bailey and Horn confirmed that Walt Disney Pictures would renew development on smaller-budgeted genre films that the studio had previously stopped producing for the theatrical exhibition market a few years prior. In 2018, nine films were announced to be in production or development for the service. These films would be budgeted between $20 million and $60 million. The studio is expected to produce approximately 3-4 films per year exclusively for Disney+, alongside its theatrical tentpole slate. Disney+ was launched on November 12, 2019, in the United States, Canada, and the Netherlands, with subsequent international expansions. Within the first two months of the service's launch, Walt Disney Pictures had released three films (Lady and the Tramp, Noelle, and Togo) exclusively for Disney+.

On March 12, 2020, Fox Family president Vanessa Morrison was named president of live-action development and production of streaming content for both Disney and 20th Century Studios, reporting directly to Bailey. That same day, Philip Steuer and Randi Hiller were also appointed as president of the studio's physical, post-production and VFX, and executive vice president for casting, respectively–overseeing these functions for both Walt Disney Pictures and 20th Century Studios. In 2023, Walt Disney Pictures celebrated its centennial alongside Walt Disney Animation Studios and their corporate parent company.

Logo 

Until 1985, instead of a traditional production logo, the opening credits of Disney films used to feature a title card that read "Walt Disney Presents", and later, "Walt Disney Productions Presents". In Never Cry Wolf, and the pre-release versions of Splash, it showed a light blue rectangle with the name "Walt Disney Pictures" and featured a white outline rectangle framing on a black screen.

Beginning with the release of Return to Oz in 1985, Walt Disney Pictures introduced its fantasy castle logo. The version with its accompanying music premiered with The Black Cauldron. The logo was created by Walt Disney Productions in traditional animation and featured a white silhouette of Disneyland's Sleeping Beauty Castle against a blue background, with the studio's name in Walt Disney text and underscored by "When You Wish Upon a Star", in arrangement composed by John Debney. A short rendition of the logo was used as a closing logo as well as in the movie Return to Oz, although the film was released months before The Black Cauldron was released. A computer-animated RenderMan variant appeared before every Pixar Animation Studios film from Toy Story until Ratatouille, featuring an original fanfare composed by Randy Newman, based on the opening score cue from Toy Story. Beginning with Dinosaur (2000), an alternative logo featuring an orange castle and logo against a black background, was occasionally presented with darker tone and live-action films, though a few animated films such as Brother Bear, the 2003 re-release of The Lion King and The Wild (the final film to use this logo) used this logo. The original incarnation of this logo resurfaced in 2021 for a merchandising line by ShopDisney, based on its original incarnation.

In 2006, the studio's vanity card logo was updated with the release of Pirates of the Caribbean: Dead Man's Chest at the behest of then-Walt Disney Studios chairman Dick Cook and studio marketing president Oren Aviv. Designed by Disney animation director Mike Gabriel and producer Baker Bloodworth, the modernized logo was created completely in computer animation by Wētā FX and yU+co and featured a 3D New Waltograph typography. The final rendering of the logo was done by Cameron Smith and Cyrese Parrish. In addition, the revamped logo includes visual references to Pinocchio, Dumbo, Cinderella, Peter Pan and Mary Poppins, and its redesigned castle incorporates elements from both the Cinderella Castle and the Sleeping Beauty Castle, as well as fireworks and Walt Disney's family crest. Mark Mancina wrote a new composition and arrangement of "When You Wish Upon a Star" to accompany the 2006 logo. It was co-arranged and orchestrated by David Metzger. In 2011, starting with The Muppets, the sequence was modified to truncate the "Walt Disney Pictures" branding to "Disney", which has mainly been used originally in home media releases in 2007. The new logo sequence has been consistently modified for high-profile releases including Tron: Legacy, Maleficent, Tomorrowland, The Jungle Book, and Beauty and the Beast.

In 2022, a new production logo was introduced for the studio's 100th anniversary in 2023, which premiered at the 2022 D23 Expo. The new castle logo features an updated opening sequence in computer animation created by Industrial Light & Magic and an arrangement of "When You Wish Upon a Star" by Christophe Beck. The magical arc that usually flies from right to left above the castle now flies from left to right, a subtle reference to several arc appearances since 2005, including the 2005 Hong Kong Disneyland logo, the 2006 Walt Disney Pictures print logo and most recently, the animated Disney+ logo. A byline appears below the Disney100 logo during the studio's 100th anniversary in 2023, reading "100 Years of Wonder". While containing the same visual references as the previous logo, new references added to it include Pocahontas, Up, Hercules, The Hunchback of Notre Dame, Snow White and the Seven Dwarfs, The Little Mermaid, Tangled, Brave and Beauty and the Beast, with the addition of Disneyland's Matterhorn from Third Man on the Mountain and Pride Rock from The Lion King in the background beyond the castle. Its first film appearance was with the release of Strange World.

Film library 

The studio's first live-action film was Treasure Island (1950). Animated films produced by Walt Disney Animation Studios and Pixar are also released by Walt Disney Pictures. The studio has released four films that have received an Academy Award for Best Picture nomination: Mary Poppins (1964), Beauty and the Beast (1991), Up (2009), and Toy Story 3 (2010).

Highest-grossing films 
Walt Disney Pictures has produced five live-action films that have grossed over $1 billion at the worldwide box office: Pirates of the Caribbean: Dead Man's Chest (2006), Alice in Wonderland (2010), Pirates of the Caribbean: On Stranger Tides (2011), Beauty and the Beast (2017) and Aladdin (2019); and has released eight animated films that have reached that milestone: Toy Story 3 (2010), Frozen (2013), Zootopia, Finding Dory (both 2016), Incredibles 2 (2018),  The Lion King, Toy Story 4, and Frozen II (three in 2019).

‡—Includes theatrical reissue(s).

PG-13-rated films 

Although Walt Disney Pictures maintains a family-friendly image, generally releasing G and PG-rated films, it does occasionally release films rated PG-13, something Touchstone Pictures was capable of doing until its closure in 2016. The first PG-13 rated film released by Walt Disney Pictures was Pirates of the Caribbean: The Curse of the Black Pearl. Additionally, Tales from Earthsea, a Studio Ghibli film, is the first and so far only animated film released by Walt Disney Pictures to receive the rating. Hamilton is notable for being the first Walt Disney Pictures film to use the expletive "fuck", although two instances of it were censored to avoid an R rating. The 2020 live-action remake of Mulan was the first live-action Disney remake to receive a PG-13 rating, with Cruella later following suit.
 
Films released by Walt Disney Pictures with a PG-13 rating include:
 Pirates of the Caribbean: The Curse of the Black Pearl (2003)
 Pirates of the Caribbean: Dead Man's Chest (2006)
 Pirates of the Caribbean: At World's End (2007)
 Prince of Persia: The Sands of Time (2010)
 Tales from Earthsea (2010)
 Pirates of the Caribbean: On Stranger Tides (2011)
 John Carter (2012)
 The Lone Ranger (2013)
 Saving Mr. Banks (2013)
 The Finest Hours (2016)
 Pirates of the Caribbean: Dead Men Tell No Tales (2017)
 Mulan (2020)
 Hamilton (2020)
 Cruella (2021)
 Jungle Cruise (2021)
The Beatles: Get Back – The Rooftop Concert (2022)

Film series and franchises

See also 
 Walt Disney Studios (division)
 Walt Disney Studios Motion Pictures
 Walt Disney Television (production company)

References

External links 
 

 
Mass media companies established in 1923
American companies established in 1983
Disney production studios
Film production companies of the United States
Entertainment companies based in California
Companies based in Burbank, California
Mass media companies established in 1983
1983 establishments in California
Walt Disney Studios (division)
American film studios

de:The Walt Disney Company#Walt Disney Pictures